Oakland is a historic house in Natchez, Adams County, Mississippi, U.S.A.

Location
It is located at 9 Oakhurst Drive in Natchez, Mississippi.

History
The house was built from 1838 to 1844 for Horatio Sprague Eustis (1811-1858) on land given to him as dowry from his father-in-law, Henry Chotard (1787-1870). It was built in the Greek Revival architectural style.

In 1858, John Minor, the grandson of Stephen Minor (1760-1844), purchased the property. During the American Civil War of 1861–1865, he supported the Union.

It now belongs to Mr John T. Green.

It has been listed on the National Register of Historic Places since October 21, 1976.

References

Houses on the National Register of Historic Places in Mississippi
Houses in Natchez, Mississippi
Greek Revival houses in Mississippi
National Register of Historic Places in Natchez, Mississippi